Kaohsiung City (Wade–Giles: Kao¹-hsiung²; Pinyin: Gāoxióng) is a special municipality located in southern Taiwan. Kaohsiung City has a population of approximately 2.72 million people as of May 2022 and is Taiwan's third most populous city and largest city in southern Taiwan.

Since founding in the 17th century, Kaohsiung has grown from a small trading village into the political and economic centre of southern Taiwan, with key industries such as manufacturing, steel-making, oil refining, freight transport and shipbuilding. It is classified as a "Gamma −" level global city by the Globalization and World Cities Research Network, with some of the most prominent infrastructures in Taiwan. The Port of Kaohsiung is the largest and busiest harbor in Taiwan while Kaohsiung International Airport is the second busiest airport in number of passengers. The city is well-connected to other major cities by high speed and conventional rail, as well as several national freeways. It also hosts the Republic of China Navy fleet headquarters and its naval academy. More recent public works such as Pier-2 Art Center, National Kaohsiung Center for the Arts and Kaohsiung Music Center have been aimed at growing the tourism and cultural industries of the city.

Etymology

Hoklo immigrants to the area during the 16th and 17th centuries called the region Takau. The surface meaning of the associated Chinese characters was "beat the dog". According to one theory, the name Takau originates from the aboriginal Siraya language and translates as "bamboo forest". According to another theory, the name evolved via metathesis from the name of the Makatao tribe, who inhabited the area at the time of European and Hoklo settlement. The Makatao is considered by some to be part of the Siraya tribe.

During the Dutch colonization of southern Taiwan, the area was known as Tancoia to Europeans for a period of about three decades. In 1662, the Dutch were expelled by the Kingdom of Tungning, founded by Ming loyalists of Koxinga. His son, Zheng Jing, renamed the village Banlian-chiu in 1664.

The name of "Takau" was restored in the late 1670s, when the town expanded drastically with immigrants from mainland China and was kept through Taiwan's cession to the Japanese Empire in 1895. In his 1903 general history of Taiwan, US Consul to Formosa James W. Davidson relates that "Takow" was already a well-known name in English. While the new name had quite a different surface meaning, its pronunciation in Japanese sounded more or less the same as the old name spoken in Hokkien.

The name Takau remains the official name of the city in Austronesian languages of Taiwan such as Rukai, although these are not widely spoken in the city. The name also remains popular locally in the naming of businesses, associations, and events.

History

The written history of Kaohsiung can be traced back to the early 17th century, through archaeological studies have found signs of human activity in the region from as long as 7,000 years ago. Prior to the 17th century, the region was inhabited by the Makatao people of the Siraya tribe, who settled on what they named Takau Isle (translated to 打狗嶼 by Ming Chinese explorers); "Takau" meaning "bamboo forest" in the aboriginal language.

Early history

The earliest evidence of human activity in the Kaohsiung area dates back to roughly 4,700–5,200 years ago. Most of the discovered remnants were located in the hills surrounding Kaohsiung Harbor. Artifacts were found at Shoushan, Longquan Temple, Taoziyuan, Zuoying, Houjing, Fudingjin and Fengbitou. The prehistoric Dapenkeng, Niuchouzi, Dahu, and Niaosong civilizations were known to inhabit the region. Studies of the prehistoric ruins at Longquan Temple have shown that that civilization occurred at roughly the same times as the beginnings of the aboriginal Makatao civilization, suggesting a possible origin for the latter. Unlike some other archaeological sites in the area, the Longquan Temple ruins are relatively well preserved. Prehistoric artifacts discovered have suggested that the ancient Kaohsiung Harbor was originally a lagoon, with early civilizations functioning primarily as Hunter-gatherer societies. Some agricultural tools have also been discovered, suggesting that some agricultural activity was also present. The pronunciation of Kaohsiung (Takao) in Japanese is similar to Takau (Takau), so the local flavor of Takao was renamed Kaohsiung.

The first Chinese records of the region were written in 1603 by Chen Di, a member of Ming admiral Shen You-rong's expedition to rid the waters around Taiwan and Penghu of pirates. In his report on the "Eastern Barbarian Lands" (Dong Fan Ji), Chen Di referred to a Ta-kau Isle:

Dutch Formosa
Taiwan became a Dutch colony in 1624, after the Dutch East India Company was ejected from Penghu by Ming forces. At the time, Takau was already one of the most important fishing ports in southern Taiwan. The Dutch named the place Tankoya, and the harbor Tancoia. The Dutch missionary François Valentijn named Takau Mountain "Ape Berg", a name that would find its way onto European navigational charts well into the 18th century. Tankoia was located north of Ape's Hill and a few hours south from Tayouan (modern-day Anping, Tainan) by sail. At the time, a wide shallow bay existed there, sufficient for small vessels. However, constant silting changed the coastline.

During this time, Taiwan was divided into five administrative districts, with Takau belonging to the southernmost district. In 1630, the first large scale immigration of Han Chinese to Taiwan began due to famine in Fujian, with merchants and traders from China seeking to purchase hunting licenses from the Dutch or hide out in aboriginal villages to escape authorities in China.

Qing Dynasty

In 1684, the Qing Dynasty annexed Taiwan and renamed the town Fongshan County, considering it a part of Taiwan Prefecture. It was first opened as a port during the 1680s and subsequently prospered fairly for generations.

Japanese rule

In 1895, Taiwan was ceded to Japan as part of the Treaty of Shimonoseki. In November 1901, twenty chō were established in total;  was established nearby. In 1909, Hōzan Chō was abolished, and Takow was merged into Tainan Chō.

In 1920, during the tenure of 8th Governor-General Den Kenjirō, districts were abolished in favor of prefectures. Thus the city was administered as  under Takao Prefecture.

The Japanese developed Takao, especially the harbor that became the foundation of Kaohsiung to be a port city. Takao was then systematically modernized and connected to the end of North-South Railway. Forming a north–south regional economic corridor from Taipei to Kaohsiung in the 1930s, Japan's Southward Policy set Kaohsiung to become an industrial center. Kaohsiung Harbor was also developed starting from 1894. The city center was relocated several times during the period due to the government's development strategy. Development was initially centered on Ki-au region but the government began laying railways, upgrading the harbor, and passing new urban plans. New industries such as refinery, machinery, shipbuilding and cementing were also introduced.

Before and during World War II it handled a growing share of Taiwan's agricultural exports to Japan, and was also a major base for Japan's campaigns in Southeast Asia and the Pacific. Extremely ambitious plans for the construction of a massive modern port were drawn up. Toward the end of the war, the Japanese promoted some industrial development at Kaohsiung, establishing an aluminum industry based on the abundant hydroelectric power produced by the Sun Moon Lake project in the mountains.

The city was heavily bombed by Task Force 38 and FEAF during World War II between 1944 and 1945.

Republic of China
After control of Taiwan was handed over from Japan to the government of the Republic of China on 25 October 1945, Kaohsiung City and Kaohsiung County were established as a provincial city and a county of Taiwan Province respectively on 25 December 1945. The official romanization of the name came to be "Kaohsiung", based on the Wade–Giles romanization of the Mandarin reading of the kanji name. Kaohsiung City then consisted of 10 districts, which were Gushan, Lianya (renamed "Lingya" in 1952), Nanzih, Cianjin, Cianjhen, Cijin, Sanmin, Sinsing, Yancheng, and Zuoying.

During this time, Kaohsiung developed rapidly. The port, badly damaged in World War II, was restored. It also became a fishing port for boats sailing to Filipino and Indonesian waters. Largely because of its climate, Kaohsiung overtook Keelung as Taiwan's major port. Kaohsiung also surpassed Tainan to become the second largest city of Taiwan in the late 1970s and Kaohsiung City was upgraded from a provincial city to special municipality on 1 July 1979, by the Executive Yuan with a total of 11 districts. The additional district is Siaogang District, which was annexed from Siaogang Township of Kaohsiung County.

The Kaohsiung Incident, where the government suppressed a commemoration of International Human Rights Day, occurred on 10 December 1979. Since then, Kaohsiung gradually grew into a political center of the Pan-Green population of Taiwan, in opposition to Taipei where the majority population is Kuomintang supporters.

On 25 December 2010, Kaohsiung City merged with Kaohsiung County to form a larger special municipality with administrative centers in Lingya District and Fongshan District.

On 31 July 2014, a series of gas explosions occurred in the Cianjhen and Lingya Districts of the city, killing 31 and injuring more than 300. Five roads were destroyed in an area of nearly  near the city center. It was the largest gas explosion in Taiwan's modern history.

Geography

The city sits on the southwestern coast of Taiwan facing the Taiwan Strait, bordering Tainan City to the north, Chiayi and Nantou County to the northwest, Taitung County to its northeast and Pingtung County to the south and southeast. The downtown areas are centered on Kaohsiung Harbor with Cijin Island on the other side of the harbor acting as a natural breakwater. The Love River (Ai River) flows into the harbor through the Old City and downtown. Zuoying Military Harbor lies to the north of Kaohsiung Harbor and the city center. Kaohsiung's natural landmarks include Ape Hill and Mount Banping.

Climate

Kaohsiung's warm climate is very much dictated by its low latitude and its exposure to warm sea temperatures year-round, with the Kuroshio Current passing by the coast of southern Taiwan, and the Central Mountain Range on the northeast blocking out the cool northeastern winds during the winter. The city, therefore, has a noticeably warmer climate than nearby cities located at similar latitudes such as Hong Kong, Guangzhou as well as various cities further south in northern Vietnam, such as Hanoi. Although the climate is classified as tropical, Kaohsiung has a defined cooler season unlike most other cities in Asia classified with this climate but located closer to the equator such as Singapore or Manila. Daily maximum temperature typically exceeds  during the warmer season (April to November) and  during the cooler season (December to March), with the exception when cold fronts strikes during the winter months, when the daily mean temperature of the city can drop between 10 and 12 °C depending on the strength of the cold front. Also, besides the high temperatures occurring during the usual summer months, daytime temperatures of inland districts of the city can often exceed  from mid-March to late April before the onset of the monsoon season, with clear skies and southwesterly airflows. At more than 2,210 hours of bright sunshine, the city is one of the sunniest areas in Taiwan.

The sea temperature of Kaohsiung Harbor remains above  year-round, the second highest of Southern Taiwan after Liuqiu Island.

Cityscape

Demographics

As of December 2018, Kaohsiung city has a population of 2,773,533 people, making it the third-largest city after New Taipei and Taichung, and a population density of 939.59 people per square kilometer. Within the city, Fongshan District is the most populated district with a population of 359,519 people, while Sinsing District is the most densely populated district with a population density of 25,820 people per square kilometer.

Ethnic composition

Han Chinese
As in most Taiwanese cities or counties, the majority of the population are Han Chinese. The Chinese are divided into 3 subgroups: Hoklo, Hakka, and Waishengren. The Hoklo and Waishengren mostly live in flatland townships and the city centre, while the majority of the Hakka population lives in the suburbs or rural townships of the northeastern hills.

Indigenous peoples
The indigenous peoples of Kaohsiung, who belong to various ethnic groups that speak languages belonging to the Austronesian language family, live mostly in the mountain indigenous district such as Taoyuan or Namasia. The main indigenous groups in the city include the Bunun, Rukai, Saaroa and the Kanakanavu.

Other ethnicities
As of December 2010, Kaohsiung hosts around 21,000 foreign spouses. Around 12,353 are Mainland Chinese, 4,244 are Vietnamese, around 800 are Japanese and Indonesians, and around 4,000 are other Asians or foreigners from Europe or America.

As of April 2013, Kaohsiung hosts 35,074 foreign workers who mainly work as factory workers or foreign maids (not including foreign specialists such as teachers and other professionals). About half of them are Indonesians, with the other half being workers from other Southeast Asian countries, mainly from Vietnam, the Philippines or Thailand.

Economy

Kaohsiung is a major international port and industrial city in the southwest of Taiwan. As an exporting center, Kaohsiung serves the agricultural interior of southern Taiwan, as well as the mountains of the southeast. Major raw material exports include rice, sugar, bananas, pineapples, peanuts (groundnuts) and citrus fruits. The  Linhai Industrial Park, on the waterfront, was completed in the mid-1970s and includes a steel mill, shipyard, petrochemical complex, and other industries. The city has an oil refinery, aluminum and cement works, fertilizer factories, sugar refineries, brick and tile works, canning factories, salt-manufacturing factories, and papermaking plants. Designated an export-processing zone in the late 1970s, Kaohsiung also attracted foreign investment to process locally purchased raw materials for export.

In 2020, Kaohsiung's land reclamation project in the Port of Kaohsiung was completed, equivalent to 16 of Taipei's Dean Forest Parks.

The Kaohsiung Harbor Bureau plans to buy 49 hectares of the reclaimed land to establish a solar energy industrial district that would be in the harbor's free trade zone.

The gross domestic product (GDP) in nominal terms of Kaohsiung City is estimated to be around US$45 billion, and US$90 billion for the metropolitan region. , the GDP per capita in nominal terms was approximately US$24,000.

Despite early success and heavy governmental investment, the city suffers from the economic North–South divide in Taiwan, which continues to be the center of political debate. There has been public aims to shift the local economy towards tourism and cultural industries, with projects such as Pier-2 Art Center, National Kaohsiung Center for the Arts and Kaohsiung Music Center.

Agriculture
The main agricultural produce in Kaohsiung are vegetables, fruits and rice with a total arable land of 473 km2, which accounts to 16% of the total area of the municipality. Kaohsiung has the highest production of guava, jujube and lychee in Taiwan. The main animal husbandry are chicken, dairy cattle, deer, duck, goose, pigs and sheep. The total annual agricultural outcome in Kaohsiung is NT$24.15 billion.

Future investment

Culture

Tourism

Main landmarks of Kaohsiung city include the 85 Sky Tower, the Ferris wheel of the Kaohsiung Dream Mall, the Kaohsiung Arena and Port of Kaohsiung. The newly developed city is also known for having a large number of shopping streets, organized night markets and newly developed leisure parks such as the Pier-2 Art Center, E-DA Theme Park, Metropolitan Park, the Kaohsiung Museum of Fine Arts and Taroko Park.

Natural attractions of the city include Shoushan (Monkey mountain), the Love River, Cijin Island, Sizihwan, the Dapingding Tropical Botanical Garden and Yushan National Park at the northeastern tip of the city. The city also features various historical attractions such as the Old City of Zuoying, a historical town built during the early 17th century, the Former British Consulate at Takao built during the late 19th century, and various sugar and crop factories built under Japanese rule.

Natural attractions
Kaohsiung city includes a wide range of different natural attractions due to its large size and geographical variation, as it is bordered by the Central Mountain Range in the northeast and the warm South China Sea to the west and southwest. The year-round warm climate allows coral reefs to grow along the coasts around Kaohsiung Harbor, with Shoushan Mountain being a small mountain completely made up of coral reefs and calcium carbonate, while the mountainous districts in the northeast include Taiwan's highest mountain, Yushan. Other notable natural attractions include the Mount Banping, Lotus Pond, and Dongsha Atoll National Park, which is currently inaccessible by the public due to military occupation.

Historical sites

A large number of historical sites and monuments were left in the city after the colonization of the Dutch in the 17th century, the Qing dynasty during the 18th and 19th century and the Japanese empire from the late 19th century to the mid 20th century.  The city government has protected various sites and monuments from further damage and many have been opened to the public since the early 1980s. Notable historical sites include the Cemetery of Zhenghaijun, Fengshan Longshan Temple, Former British Consulate at Takao, Former Dinglinzihbian Police Station, Meinong Cultural and Creative Center, Former Sanhe Bank, and the Kaohsiung Lighthouse, one of the oldest lighthouses of the city.

Museums

Kaohsiung is home to many museums, including the Chung Li-he Museum, Cijin Shell Museum, Fo Guang Shan Buddha Museum, Jiasian Petrified Fossil Museum, Kaohsiung Astronomical Museum, Kaohsiung Hakka Cultural Museum, Kaohsiung Harbor Museum, Kaohsiung Museum of Fine Arts, Kaohsiung Museum of History, Kaohsiung Museum of Labor, Kaohsiung Vision Museum, Meinong Hakka Culture Museum, National Science and Technology Museum, Republic of China Air Force Museum, Soya-Mixed Meat Museum, Taiwan Pineapple Museum, Taiwan Sugar Museum, Takao Railway Museum, Xiaolin Pingpu Cultural Museum and YM Museum of Marine Exploration Kaohsiung.

Parks and zoos
As the largest municipality in Taiwan, Kaohsiung has a number of newly built leisure areas and parks. Notable parks or pavilions in the city include the Central Park, Siaogangshan Skywalk Park, Fo Guang Shan Monastery, the Dragon and Tiger Pagodas, Spring and Autumn Pavilions, the Love Pier, Singuang Ferry Wharf and Kaohsiung Fisherman's Wharf. Notable zoo in the city includes the Kaohsiung City Shousan Zoo.

Other

Kaohsiung is home to many night markets, such as Jin-Zuan Night Market, Liuhe Night Market Ruifeng Night Market and Zhonghua Street Night Market, and the Kaisyuan Night Market. Other attractions include the Cijin Tianhou Temple, Dome of Light of Kaohsiung MRT's Formosa Boulevard Station, the Kaohsiung Mosque and the Tower of Light of Sanmin District.

Traditional "wet" markets have long been the source of meat, fish, and produce for many residents. With the arrival of Western-style supermarkets in the 1980s and 1990s, such markets have encountered fierce competition. In 1989, the global leader in hypermarkets, Carrefour, entered Asia, opening its first store in Kaohsiung. Due to the success of its Taiwan operation, the French retailer expanded throughout the country and Asia. Jean-Luc Chéreau, the general manager in Taiwan from 1993 to 1999, used this newfound understanding of Chinese culture and ways of doing business with Chinese customers to lead its China expansion starting in 1999. As of February 2020, Carrefour has opened 137 hypermarkets and supermarkets in Taiwan. Despite the fierce competition from "Westernized" supermarkets, Taiwan's traditional markets and mom-and-pop stores remain "one of the most popular retail formats for many Asian families when they purchase daily food items and basic household goods."

Coffee cafes have become famous and numerous in the city. With the arrival of Western-style chains many new local cafes have opened in the recent years.

Languages

The majority of those living in Kaohsiung can communicate in both Taiwanese Hokkien and  Mandarin.  Some of the elderly who grew up during the Japanese colonization of Taiwan can communicate in Japanese, while most of the younger population has basic English skills.

Since the spread of Standard Chinese after the Nationalist Government retreated to Taiwan in 1949, Hakka Chinese and various Formosan languages are gradually no longer spoken with the new generation and many Formosan languages are therefore classified as moribund or endangered languages by the United Nations. Nowadays, only elder Hakka people mostly living in Meinong, Liouguei, Shanlin and Jiasian districts can communicate in Hakka and elder Taiwanese aborigines living mostly in the rural districts of Namasia and Taoyuan can communicate with the aboriginal languages. The Taiwanese government has established special affairs committees for both the Aboriginals and the Hakkas to protect their language, culture, and minority rights.

Arts

Kaohsiung has rich resources of ocean, mountains and forests which shape a unique and active multi-faceted art and cultural aesthetic in public infrastructure and transport, public art, and city architecture, from MRT stations and city space to art galleries. The "Dome light" in the concourse of Formosa Boulevard Station of Kaohsiung MRT is one of the world's largest public glass works of art. The city also has the Urban Spotlight Arcade spanning along the street in Cianjin District. In October 2018, Weiwuying (the National Kaohsiung Centre for the Arts), designed by Mecanoo, opened.

Religion

The religious population of Kaohsiung is mainly divided into five main religious groups: Buddhists, Taoists, Muslim and Christians (Catholics and Protestants). , Kaohsiung City has 1,481 temples, the second highest in Taiwan after Tainan. Kaohsiung also has 306 churches.

Buddhism
Buddhism is one of the major religions in Taiwan, with over 35% of Taiwan's population identifying as Buddhists. The same applies to Kaohsiung city. Kaohsiung also hosts the largest Buddhist temple in Taiwan, the Fo Guang Shan Monastery with its Fo Guang Shan Buddha Museum. There are also other famous Buddhist temples such as Fengshan Longshan Temple and Hong Fa Temple.

Taoism
Around 33% of the Taiwanese population are Taoists, making it the second largest religion of Taiwan. Most people who believe in Taoism also ascribe to Buddhism at the same time, as the differences and boundaries between the two religions are not always clear. Many residents of the area also worship the sea goddess known as Tian Shang Sheng Mu or Mazu, who is variously syncretized as a Taoist immortal or embodiment of the bodhisattva Guanyin. Her temple on Cijin Island, Chi Jin Mazu Temple, is the oldest in the city, with its original bamboo-and-thatch structure first opened in 1673. The area surrounding it formed the center of the city's early settlement. There are also other prominent Taoist temples such as Fengshan Tiangong Temple, dedicated to the Jade Emperor, Cih Ji Palace, dedicated to Bao Sheng Da Di, Qing Shui Temple, dedicated to Qing Shui Zu Shi and Gushan Daitian Temple dedicated to Wang Ye worship.

Christianity
Christianity is a minority religion in Taiwan. It was first brought onto the island when the Dutch and Spanish colonized Taiwan during the 17th century, mostly to the aboriginals. Kaohsiung currently hosts around 56,000 Christians.

Islam
Besides the majority population of Buddhists and Taoists, Kaohsiung also includes a rather tiny population of Muslims. During the Chinese Civil War, some 20,000 Muslims, mostly soldiers and civil servants, fled mainland China with the Kuomintang government to Taiwan. During the 1980s, another few thousand Muslims from Myanmar and Thailand, whom are mostly descendants of Nationalist soldiers who fled Yunnan as a result of the communist takeover, migrated to Taiwan in search of a better life, resulting in an increase of Muslim population within the country. More recently, with the rise of Indonesian workers working in Taiwan, an estimated number of 88,000 Indonesian Muslims currently live in the country, in addition to the existing 53,000 Taiwanese Muslims. Combining all demographics, Taiwan hosts around 140,000 Muslims, with around 25,000 living in Kaohsiung. Kaohsiung Mosque is the largest mosque in Kaohsiung and the main gathering site of Muslims within the city.

Politics

Government

Sometimes Kaohsiung used to be seen as the political opposite of Taipei. While northern Taiwan leans towards the Pan-Blue Coalition in the state-level elections, southern Taiwan, including Kaohsiung, leaned towards the Pan-Green Coalition since the late 1990s. Frank Hsieh of the Democratic Progressive Party was reelected twice as Mayor of Kaohsiung, where he was widely credited for transforming the city from an industrial sprawl into an attractive modern metropolis. Hsieh resigned from the office of mayor to take up the office of Premier of the Republic of China in 2005. The municipal election, held on 9 December 2006, resulted in a victory for the Democratic Progressive Party's candidate Chen Chu, the first elected female mayor of special municipality in Taiwan, defeating her Kuomintang rival and former deputy mayor, Huang Chun-ying. As of 12 June 2020, the mayor of Kaohsiung City is Chen Chi-mai.

Subdivisions
Kaohsiung is divided into 38 districts, three of which are mountain indigenous districts. There are a total of 651 villages in which each village is subdivided into neighborhoods (鄰). There are 18,584 neighborhoods in Kaohsiung City. Lingya and Fongshan districts are the administrative centers of the city while Lingya and Sinsing Districts are the two most densely populated districts of the city. Kaohsiung has the most numbers of districts among other special municipalities in Taiwan.

Note: There are several romanization systems used in Taiwan. This table contains both Hanyu Pinyin (the official standard of the central government), and Tongyong Pinyin (the official standard of the Kaohsiung City Government). The major order of districts referred to the code of administrative area.

Notable people
 
 
Joe Alexander (1986–), Taiwanese-born American-Isareli basketball player
Eddy Chen (1993–), Taiwanese-Australian violinist and Member of TwoSet Violin
Yi-wei Chen (1987–), Taiwanese soccer player
Wei-Yin Chen (1985–), Taiwanese baseball player
Tony Hwang (1964–), Taiwanese-American politician
Tzu-Wei Lin (1994–), Taiwanese baseball player
Tzu-ying Tai (1994–), Taiwanese badminton player
Kuo-chu Wu (1970–2006), Taiwanese choreographer
Brett Yang (1992–), Taiwanese-Australian violinist and Member of TwoSet Violin

Transportation

Port of Kaohsiung

A major port, through which pass most of Taiwan's marine imports and exports, is located in the city but is not managed by the city government. Instead, it is administrated by Kaohsiung Port Authority, under the Ministry of Transportation. There is a push for Kaohsiung City to annex the Port of Kaohsiung to facilitate better regional planning.

Also known as the "Harbour Capital" of Taiwan, Kaohsiung has always had a strong link with the ocean and maritime transportation. Ferries play a key role in everyday transportation, especially for transportation across the harbor. With five terminals and 23 berths, the Port of Kaohsiung is Taiwan's largest container port and the 13th largest in the world.

Kaohsiung is one of the biggest ports in the world for importing shark fins, sold at high prices in the restaurants and shops of Taiwan and China. They are brought in from overseas and are placed out to dry in the sun on residential rooftops near the port.

Kaohsiung International Airport

Kaohsiung City is also home to Taiwan's second-largest international airport, the Kaohsiung International Airport, located in Siaogang District near the city's center. It is one of the three major international airports of Taiwan, serving passengers of the entire southern and southeastern part of the country. However, the size of the airport is relatively small, with short runways compared to other major airports of Taiwan due to its age and its location near the city center, making it impossible for large aircraft such as the Airbus A380 to land at the airport. As a result, plans for runway expansion or building a new airport in replacement have been proposed.

Rapid transit

Kaohsiung Mass Rapid Transit opened for service in March 2008.

Two of Kaohsiung's MRT stations, Formosa Boulevard Station and Central Park Station, were ranked among the top 50 most beautiful subway systems in the world by Metrobits.org in 2011. In 2012, the two stations respectively are ranked as the 2nd and the 4th among the top 15 most beautiful subway stops in the world by BootsnAll.

Circular Light Rail

The Circular Light Rail Line (also known as the Kaohsiung LRT, Kaohsiung Tram) for Kaohsiung City is a light rail line. Construction of Phase 1, known as the Waterside Light Rail began in June 2013 and is in full operation since September 2017. To combat air pollution, usage of the light rail, as well as buses, was made free of charge for electronic ticket holders from December to February, when air pollution is at its peak.

Railway
The city is served by the Taiwan Railways Administration's Western Line and Pingtung Line. Kaohsiung Main Station is an underground station, replacing the old ground level station. Taiwan High Speed Rail also serves Kaohsiung City at Zuoying Station in northern Kaohsiung City.

Sports

Kaohsiung is home to Taiwan's largest international-class stadium, the National Stadium, with a maximum capacity of 55,000 seats, as well as Kaohsiung Arena. The city hosted the 2009 World Games at the National Stadium. Nearly 6,000 athletes, officials, coaches, referees and others from 103 countries participated in the 2009 Kaohsiung World Games.

Taiwan's Chinese Professional Baseball League has a professional baseball team, TSG Hawks, based in Kaohsiung.

Kaohsiung also has two professional basketball teams, the Kaohsiung Aquas of the T1 League and the Kaohsiung 17LIVE Steelers of the P. League+. Kaohsiung was also home to the Kaohsiung Truth of the ASEAN Basketball League. They were the first team in the history of the league that was based outside Southeast Asia. The team folded in 2017.

Other recent major sporting events held by Kaohsiung include:
2001 Asian Cycling Championships
2005 WPA World Nine-ball Championship
2011 AFC President's Cup
2013 World Modern Pentathlon Championships
2016 Asian Men's U20 Volleyball Championship
WTA Taiwan Open (2016)
2019 U-19 Asia Rugby Championship
Kaohsiung Fubon Marathon (held annually)

Education

Kaohsiung has a number of colleges and junior colleges offering training in commerce, education, maritime technology, medicine, modern languages, nursing, and technology, as well as various international schools and eight national military schools, including the three major military academies of the country, the Republic of China Military Academy, Republic of China Naval Academy and Republic of China Air Force Academy.

Universities
I-Shou University
Kaohsiung Medical University
National Kaohsiung Normal University
National Sun Yat-sen University
National University of Kaohsiung

Technical and vocational universities
Cheng Shiu University
Fooyin University
National Kaohsiung University of Hospitality and Tourism
National Kaohsiung University of Science and Technology
Wenzao Ursuline University of Languages

High schools and junior high schools

The Affiliated Hospitality Senior High School of National Kaohsiung University of Hospitality and Tourism
The Affiliated Senior High School of National Kaohsiung Normal University
Cheng Yi Senior High School
Chung Cheng Armed Forces Preparatory School
Chung Shan Industrial & Commercial School
Chung-Hwa School of Arts
FUHWA Senior High School
Guoguang Laboratory School, National Sun Yat-sen University
Kao-Feng Vocational High School
Kaohsiung Dah Yung Senior High School
Kaohsiung Municipal Chung-Cheng Industrial High School
Kaohsiung Municipal Chungshan Senior High School
Kaohsiung Municipal Cianjhen Senior High School
Kaohsiung Municipal Fu Cheng High School
Kaohsiung Municipal Gushan Senior High School
Kaohsiung Municipal Haiching Vocational High School of Technology and Commerce
Kaohsiung Municipal Jhongjheng Senior High School
Kaohsiung Municipal Kaohsiung Girls' Senior High School
Kaohsiung Municipal Kaohsiung Industrial High School
Kaohsiung Municipal Kaohsiung Senior High School
Kaohsiung Municipal Kaohsiung Vocational High School of Commerce
Kaohsiung Municipal Lujhu Senior High School
Kaohsiung Municipal Nanzih Comprehensive Senior High School
Kaohsiung Municipal Renwu Senior High School
Kaohsiung Municipal Rueisiang High School
Kaohsiung Municipal Sanmin Home Economics & Commerce Vocational High School
Kaohsiung Municipal Sanmin Senior High School
Kaohsiung Municipal Siaogang Senior High School
Kaohsiung Municipal Sinsing Senior High School
Kaohsiung Municipal Tsoying Senior High School
Kaohsiung MunicipalHsin Chuang Senior High School
Lichih Senior High School
National Feng-Hsin Senior High School
National Feng-Shan Senior High School
National FongShan Senior Commercial & Industrial Vocational School
National Kangshan Agricultural & Industrial Vocational Senior High School
National Kangshan Senior High School
Saint Dominic's Catholic High School
Sansin High School of Commerce And Home Economics Kaohsiung
Shu-Te Home economics&Commercial High School
Sin-Guang Senior High School
Taiwan Kaohsiung St. Paul's High School

International schools
Dominican International School Kaohsiung
I-Shou International School 
Kaohsiung American School 
Kivam Junior High School
Morrison Academy Kaohsiung

Military schools

Republic of China Air Force Academy

Republic of China Military Academy
Republic of China Naval Academy

(Note: The lists above are not comprehensive.)

Conferences and events
The Kaohsiung Exhibition Center, built by the Kaohsiung City Government, was opened on 14 April 2014. It includes an exhibition space for 1,500 booths, and a convention hall for 2,000 people.

The center hosted the Taiwan International Boat Show in May 2014. Another conference and event-related venue is the newly renovated International Convention Center Kaohsiung in 2013.

Sister cities and twin towns
Kaohsiung is twinned with the following locations.

 Barranquilla, Colombia
 Belize City, Belize
 Brisbane, Queensland, Australia
 Blantyre, Malawi
 Busan, South Korea
 Cartago, Costa Rica
 Cebu, Central Visayas, Philippines
 Colorado Springs, Colorado, United States
 Da Nang, Vietnam
 Dipolog, Zamboanga Peninsula, Philippines
 Durban, South Africa
 Erzgebirgskreis, Saxony, Germany
 George Town, Penang, Malaysia
 Hachiōji, Tokyo, Japan
 Honolulu, Hawaii, United States
 Istanbul, Turkey
 Knoxville, Tennessee, United States
 Kumamoto, Kumamoto, Japan
 Little Rock, Arkansas, United States
 Macon, Georgia, United States
 Malé, Maldives
 Matsumoto, Nagano, Japan
 Miami, Florida, United States
 Mobile, Alabama, United States
 Monterrey, Nuevo León, Mexico
 Mumbai, Maharashtra, India
 Panama City, Panama
 Pensacola, Florida, United States
 Plains, Georgia, United States
 Portland, Oregon, United States
 Rio de Janeiro, Brazil
 Saint Petersburg, Russia
 San Antonio, Texas, United States
 San Diego, California, United States
 Seattle, Washington, United States
 Surabaya, East Java, Indonesia
 Tijuana, Baja California, Mexico 
 Tulsa, Oklahoma, United States

See also

Administrative divisions of Taiwan
List of cities in Taiwan

Explanatory notes

Words in native languages

References

External links

 

 
1620s establishments in the Dutch Empire
1662 establishments in Asia
Municipalities of Taiwan
Populated coastal places in Taiwan
Populated places established by the Dutch East India Company
Populated places established in 1662
Port cities and towns in Taiwan